Dokken is an American heavy metal band from Los Angeles, California. Formed in 1978, the group originally consisted of eponymous vocalist and guitarist Don Dokken, bassist Steven R. Barry and drummer Greg Pecka. By the time they recorded their debut album Breaking the Chains, the band's lineup featured lead guitarist George Lynch, bassist Juan Croucier and drummer/vocalist Mick Brown. The current lineup of Dokken includes the eponymous vocalist, guitarist Jon Levin (since 2003), bassist Chris McCarvill (since 2015) and drummer BJ Zampa (since 2019).

History

1978–1983
Don Dokken formed his eponymous band Dokken in 1978, after two years fronting a group called Airborn. The outfit's first recording was the single "Hard Rock Woman", on which Robin Trower band members Rustee Allen (bass) and Bill Lordan (drums) performed, as Dokken was yet to hire an official band. By the time the release was printed, bassist Steven R. Barry and drummer Greg Pecka had been brought in, so they were credited on the sleeve as band members. For the band's first tour in Germany the same year, Barry was replaced by Juan Croucier. A second German tour followed in late 1980, which featured a lineup of Dokken with lead guitarist Greg Leon, bassist Gary Link and drummer Gary Holland. The tour spawned recordings for the EP Back in the Streets, released in 1989.

In early 1981, Croucier returned to Dokken, joined by new guitarist George Lynch and drummer "Wild" Mick Brown of Xciter. After signing with Carrere Records, the band recorded its debut album Breakin' the Chains in the summer, which was initially credited to Don Dokken as a solo release. Bass on the album was performed by Accept's Peter Baltes, as Croucier reportedly "missed the deadline to get to Germany" for the sessions. After its release, the band returned to the US and, according to Don Dokken, "For a year and a half, nothing happened" – Croucier joined Ratt, while Lynch and Brown returned to Xciter. In the summer of 1983, Breaking the Chains was re-recorded with Croucier and released in September by Elektra/Asylum Records. A few days before its release, Croucier left to commit full-time to Ratt.

1983–2002
Croucier was replaced after the release of Breaking the Chains by Jeff Pilson. This lineup remained constant throughout the rest of the 1980s, releasing the band's most successful albums in Tooth and Nail, Under Lock and Key, Back for the Attack and Beast from the East. In early 1989, however, the group broke up due to ongoing tensions between Dokken and Lynch. Dokken has claimed that Lynch's excessive drug use was the reason for the split, while the guitarist has blamed disagreements over financial arrangements for the breakup, claiming that the frontman "decided that he wanted it all, he didn't wanna share it with us".

In late 1994, Lynch was convinced to reunite with Dokken to complete a reformation of the band's previous lineup, adding lead guitar overdubs to a new album released the next year, Dysfunctional. However, after one more album, Shadowlife, Lynch left again in late 1997. He was replaced by former Europe guitarist John Norum, who joined partway through an American tour before the end of the year. By the next summer, former Winger and Alice Cooper guitarist Reb Beach had taken over the position. Beach recorded one studio album, Erase the Slate, before Norum returned in July 2001. The group started recording a new album, but in October 2001 it was announced that Pilson had been replaced for the sessions by bassist Barry Sparks, although this was initially not a full-time replacement. The following month, however, Don Dokken confirmed that Pilson had officially left to focus on his various other projects.

2002–2016

After the release of Long Way Home, John Norum left again in June 2002. Although his departure was initially credited to an injury, the guitarist later explained that it was due to tensions with Don Dokken, claiming that "he became this awful person that I didn't want to have anything to do with." Following Norum's second departure, the band was temporarily joined by Italian guitarist Alex De Rosso. The 2002 tour also saw drummer Mick Brown replaced for one show by Adam Hamilton of L.A. Guns due to a recurring shoulder injury. By late 2003, Dokken had a new full-time lead guitarist in Jon Levin, formerly of Warlock, who debuted on Hell to Pay in 2004.

Following the release and promotion of Lightning Strikes Again, Sparks temporarily left to tour with UFO in the summer of 2009, with former Great White bassist Sean McNabb taking his place. Early the next year, Sparks had to step back from his duties with both bands in order to take care of a family member. McNabb subsequently remained, debuting on the 2010 collection of re-recordings Greatest Hits. He also performed on 2012's Broken Bones, before being replaced in November 2014 by former Yngwie Malmsteen vocalist Mark Boals due to his inability to commit full-time to Dokken. Within a year, however, Boals had been replaced by Chris McCarvill.

Since 2016
In June 2016, following months of rumours, it was announced that the "classic" Dokken lineup including guitarist George Lynch, bassist Jeff Pilson and drummer Mick Brown (still a regular member) were set to reunite for a short run of shows in Japan that October. Despite receiving offers to add more shows in various countries around the world, Don Dokken assured fans that a reunion would "never happen again" after the Japanese tour. Footage from one of the shows was later released as Return from the East Live (2016) in April 2018.

In May 2019, Brown announced that he was "taking a break" from performing with Dokken. Within a couple of months of the announcement, Don Dokken added that Brown was permanently retiring, with his temporary replacement Bill "BJ" Zampa of House of Lords taking his place in the group. In 2020 the band released The Lost Songs: 1978–1981, on which Levin and Zampa performed some overdubs on old tracks.

Members

Current

Former

Touring

Session

Timeline

Lineups

References

External links
Dokken official website

Dokken